This is a list of trolleybus systems in Brazil by Estado. It includes all trolleybus systems, past and present.

Bahia

Ceará

Minas Gerais

Pernambuco

Rio de Janeiro

Rio Grande do Sul

São Paulo

See also

 List of trolleybus systems, for all other countries
 List of town tramway systems in Brazil
 List of light-rail transit systems
 List of rapid transit systems
 Trolleybus usage by country

Sources

Books and periodicals
 Murray, Alan. 2000. World Trolleybus Encyclopaedia. Reading, Berkshire, UK: Trolleybooks.
 Peschkes, Robert. 1980. World Gazetteer of Tram, Trolleybus, and Rapid Transit Systems - Part One, Latin America. Exeter, UK: Quail Map Company.
 Trolleybus Magazine (ISSN 0266-7452). National Trolleybus Association (UK). Bimonthly.

Website
 Morrison, Allen  (November 2007).  Latin American Trolleybus Installations  Retrieved on 2010-04-05.

References

External links

Trolleybus systems
Brazil
Trolleybus transport in Brazil